The Peniarth Manuscripts, also known as the Hengwrt–Peniarth Manuscripts, are a collection of medieval Welsh manuscripts now held by the National Library of Wales in Aberystwyth. The collection was originally assembled by Robert Vaughan (c. 1592–1667) of Hengwrt, Merionethshire. During the 19th century it was held in Peniarth Mansion, Llanegryn.

In 1859 William Watkin Edward Wynne inherited the collection. In 1898 it was sold to Sir John Williams, who had himself acquired a large private library. Subsequently a plan to establish a National Library of Wales emerged. When it did so, Williams promised that he would donate the collection to the library on condition that it would be based in Aberystwyth. This condition was met, and Sir John duly donated the collection to the National Library.

The collection contains some of the oldest and most important Welsh manuscripts in existence. For example it includes the Black Book of Carmarthen, Book of Taliesin and White Book of Rhydderch (containing the Four Branches of the Mabinogi, the Three Welsh Romances and other tales) and a number of other ancient manuscripts, including early texts of the Cyfraith Hywel and by Beirdd yr Uchelwyr (the Poets of the Nobility). The manuscripts in other languages include two Latin manuscripts of Geoffrey of Monmouth's Historia Regum Britanniae and an early illuminated version of the Canterbury Tales known as the Hengwrt Chaucer.

Selected list of manuscripts 
 Black Book of Carmarthen
 Black Book of Chirk
 White Book of Rhydderch
 Book of Taliesin
 Beunans Meriasek
 Hengwrt Chaucer
 Peniarth 6. Contents include the earliest surviving texts (c.1225–75) of parts of the Four Branches of the Mabinogi.
 Peniarth 20
 History of the Kings (Peniarth 23C)
 Peniarth 28
 Peniarth 32
 Peniarth 49
 Peniarth 51
 Peniarth 53
 Peniarth 109
 Peniarth 164
 Peniarth 259B
 Peniarth 481
 Vaux Passional (Peniarth 482D)

See also 
 List of Welsh Law manuscripts

Bibliography 
 J. Gwenogvryn Evans, Reports on Manuscripts in the Welsh Language, volume I, number 2 and 3.
 Handlist of Manuscripts in the National Library of Wales, volume I, number 1.

Welsh manuscripts
 
Welsh literature
Medieval documents of Wales